This list provides an overview of animated productions that can be considered as milestones in the development of animation techniques or in artistic or commercial success.

References

Animation-related lists
animation